Presidential elections were held in Chile on 22 October 1925. They were the first direct presidential elections in the country's history and the first to be held under the new 1925 constitution. The result was a victory for Emiliano Figueroa, who received 72% of the vote.

Electoral system
The election was held using the absolute majority system, under which a candidate had to receive over 50% of the popular vote to be elected. If no candidate received over 50% of the vote, a joint session of the National Congress would vote on the two candidates that received the most votes.

Campaign
A member of the Liberal Democratic Party, Figueroa ran as an independent, and was also supported by the Conservative Party, the Radical Party, the United Liberal Party, the Doctrinal Liberal Party, and Democrat Party, the Unionist Liberal Party and the Aliancista Liberal Democratic Party.

Results

References

Presidential elections in Chile
1925 in Chile
Chile
October 1925 events